Castles in the Air is a musical comedy, with a book and lyrics by Raymond Wilson Peck and music by Percy Wenrich (additional lyrics by R. Locke).  The story concerns two young men, Monty Blair and John Brown, who mistake an exclusive Westchester resort for an inn.  They decide to pretend to be nobility, and Monty introduces John as a Latvian prince.  Evelyn's uncle Philip decides to teach her a lesson about social climbing by taking her to Latvia, intending to expose John as an impostor.  The plan backfires, though, because John really is a prince.

The musical opened on Broadway in the Selwyn Theatre on September 6, 1926. It moved to the Century Theatre on December 6, 1926.  The production was directed by Frank S. Merlin and choreographed by John Boyle and Julian Mitchell.  It starred J. Harold Murray as John and Vivienne Segal as Evelyn.

On June 29, 1927, a production opened in London, at the Shaftesbury Theatre.

Roles and original cast
Monty Blair – Bernard Granville
John Brown – J. Harold Murray  
Evelyn Devine – Vivienne Segal  
Philip Rodman – Stanley Forde  
General Slodak – Walter Edwin  
Count Draga – Richard Farrell
Lieutenant – Edward Gorman  
Kemlar – William Hasson 
The Queen Regent – Thais Lawton  
Mme. Joujou Durant – Claire Madjette  
The Chancellor – Gregory Ratoff  
George Sedgwick – Allen Waterous  
Annie Moore – Joyce White  
Amos – Robert Williamson

Musical numbers
Act 1      
I Don't Blame 'Em – Annie Moore and Boys 
Love's Refrain – Mme. Joujou Durant and Ensemble 
Lantern of Love (Lyrics By R. Locke and Raymond W. Peck) – Evelyn Devine and Ensemble 
The Singer's Career, Ha! Ha! – Mme. Joujou Durant and Philip Rodman 
The Other Fellow's Girl – Monty Blair, Sextette and Ensemble 
If You Are in Love with a Girl – John Brown and Ensemble 
The Sweetheart of Your Dream – Evelyn Devine 
I Would Like to Fondle You – Annie Moore, Monty Blair, Sextette and Ensemble 
The Rainbow of Your Smile – John Brown 
       
Act 2      
Baby – Monty Blair and Ensemble 
Latavia – John Brown and Ensemble 
Land of Romance – Evelyn Devine 
My Lips, My Love, My Soul! – John Brown and Evelyn Devine 
The Latavian Chant – Annie Moore and Ensemble 
       
Act 3      
Girls and the Gimmies – Monty Blair, Sextette and Ensemble 
Love Rules the World – Mme. Joujou Durant and John Brown

References

External links

1926 musicals
Broadway musicals
Musicals set in the Roaring Twenties